The Catholic Diocese of the Australian Military Services, is a military ordinariate of the Roman Catholic Church immediately subject to the Holy See. It was established in 1969 and maintains its Chancery office in Canberra. It is a Diocese in its own right and not governed under any Diocese or Archdiocese.

Its ordinary (bishop) and his chaplains serve the members of the Australian Defence Force (ADF) and their families in all three services; the Royal Australian Navy (RAN), the Australian Army and the Royal Australian Air Force (RAAF) regardless of location.

History
Catholic chaplaincy has been provided for Australians serving in the military since the 1901 contribution of forces to fight in the Boxer Rebellion. However, it was not until 1912 that a bishop, Thomas Carr, the then Archbishop of Melbourne, was delegated by the Catholic bishops of Australia as the bishop of the Australian Armed Forces.

From 1912 until 1969, Catholic armed servicemen and women were in the care of a bishop delegated to them who was also a bishop elsewhere. In 1969, Pope Paul VI created the Military Vicariate of Australia. In 1984, Pope John Paul II elevated the vicariate to a military ordinariate with its own bishop. The diocese was officially established under an apostolic constitution, Spirituali Militum Curae, on 21 July 1986 and given final approval in 1988.

Structure
The headquarters of the diocese is located in Campbell, Australian Capital Territory,  while being immediately subject to the Holy See. Unlike conventional dioceses, which are restricted to a geographical area, the Catholic Diocese of the ADF covers all of Australia and its 30 Defence bases, and any Australian military facilities or units overseas or off-shore.

Bishop
The Catholic bishop is the head of the Catholic denomination recognised in the Defence Instructions (General) of the ADF.

The following individuals have been elected as Bishop of the Armed Services:

Principal Chaplains
Army and Air Force have three Principal Chaplains; one each to represent Catholicism, Anglicanism and Protestantism. In January 2018, the Australian Navy removed the requirement to have three Principal Chaplains. They are accorded the rank relevant to the Division Five chaplain for each branch (1 star rank or O7). Principal Chaplains (who in the Catholic Military Diocese are also Episcopal Vicars, and currently are also Monsignors) oversee the chaplains of their particular Service, managing matters such as recruitment, postings, deployments, promotions, welfare and discipline.

Catholic priests who are promoted to Principal Chaplains of the ADF are traditionally nominated for and receive the title monsignor from the Pope. The current Catholic Principal Chaplains of the ADF are: Air Force - Monsignor (Air Commodore) Peter O'Keefe AM VG EV (also Vicar General of the Military Ordinariate); Navy - Monsignor (Commodore) Stuart Hall, RAN (also full-time Parish Priest in Malvern East Victoria); Army - Monsignor (Brigadier) Glynn Murphy OAM (also full-time Parish Priest Horsham Victoria). Currently all Catholic Principal Chaplains are in the Reserve Forces.

Chaplains
Chaplains are charged with the responsibility to care for the religious, spiritual and pastoral (welfare) needs of Defence members and their families. For Catholic chaplains, this includes providing the sacraments, especially to Defence members isolated from civilian Catholic churches/parishes or on war operations. Chaplains, especially those appointed to training establishments, conduct classes on ethics, morals, values and character development with their military units. Chaplains in the Navy, Army and Air Force undergo the same training as other ADF officers.

With only a few exceptions, ordained Catholic chaplains (priests and deacons) are "on loan" to the Military Diocese from a "civilian" diocese for an agreed period of time, which may or may not be renewed. The Bishop of the Military relies on the other Australian bishops for the supply of enough clergy to meet the chaplaincy needs of Catholics in the ADF. It is possible for a priest or deacon to be ordained solely into (incardinated) the Defence Diocese/Military Ordinariate and thus he fully belongs to the Military Diocese for life. 

ADF chaplains are generally addressed by their first name by Officers of equal or superior rank or as "Sir" by those of lower ranks, however Catholic chaplains are often referred to as "Father" or as "Padre" by soldiers, sailors, and RAAF personnel irrespective of their rank.

Divisions
Chaplains in the ADF are organised into five divisions:

 Australian Navy Chaplains do not wear any rank insignia (instead wearing a cross and anchor emblem copied from the British Royal Navy), but under Defence Instructions - Navy, they are accorded a status equivalent to the rank listed in the table. Although differentiated by Division, Navy Chaplains in Divisions 1 to 3 are all given the status of a Commander (OF-4/O5).

Current Chaplains
There were 25,614 Roman Catholics in the ADF out of a total of 102,764 (full-time and reservists). Although Catholics constitute the largest religious group in the ADF, the diocese struggles to recruit enough chaplains to serve the Catholic defence population.

Currently there are 17 Full Time Chaplains, 18 Reserve Chaplains

Noncombatant status
See: Military chaplain#Non-combatant status

Chapels
The Catholic Church has many chapels located on Defence Force establishments, primarily but not exclusively for the use of Catholic personnel. Some chapels are "non-denominational" and are shared with other Christian denominations.

See also

Australian Catholic Bishops Conference
Australian military chaplains
Military chaplain badges and insignia
Operation Testament, the Australian Defence Force contribution to the Catholic World Youth Day 2008
Patron saints of the military
Roman Catholicism in Australia
Australian Army Chaplains
Royal Australian Navy Chaplains

References

Australia, Military Ordinariate of
Australia
Australian Defence Force
Australian Defence Force
Australian Defence Force